Gamerizon is a video game developer and publisher headquartered in Montreal, Quebec, Canada. Gamerizon develops games for iPhone and iPad. The company's most profitable products on the Apple's App Store and include "Chop Chop Ninja", "Chop Chop Runner", "Chop Chop Tennis" and "Chop Chop Caveman". According to Gamerizon, 15 million "Chop Chop" games have been downloaded so far on the App Store and six of those have been downloaded a million times each. Gamerizon's Chop Chop series are easily recognizable by the cartoony look of their big-headed characters.

In an interview to video game magazine PocketGamer, Alex Sakiz revealed the company’s ambition to expand the Chop Chop Franchise to 20 games and 40 million downloads. In the same interview, he mentioned the Chop Chop games will be available on Android phones and possibly on other platforms.

In March 2011, Gamerizon was named 32nd on PocketGamer‘s Top 50 App Developers.

On September 15 of 2011, Gamerizon announced they have closed a 5 million dollars first round investment with Vanedge Capital and iNovia Capital. The Montreal-based studio will be looking to hire 100 employees within 2 years.

In March 2012, Gamerizon announced their new project at the Game Developers Conference. Chop Chop Ninja World will be the first social freemium action platformer on both iOS and Android. Subsequently, Gamerizon was named by Pocket Gamer in its Top 10 Mobile Game Developers to Watch in 2012. Gamerizon announced on its Facebook page in October that the game will be released worldwide on November 29.

In April 2012, Gamerizon announced Iro, the main character of their hit-game Chop Chop Ninja, will be the star of his own animated series on the Canadian channel Teletoon and will air at the Fall of 2014.

In May 2012, Gamerizon's CEO Alex Sakiz was named in C2-MTL's Top 25 Emerging Entrepreneurs.

References

External links
 Official website

Companies based in Montreal
Video game companies established in 2008
Video game companies of Canada
Video game publishers
Video game development companies